Patrick Laurence Murphy (28 October 1920 – 18 March 2007) was an Australian Roman Catholic Bishop who served as the first bishop of the Roman Catholic Diocese of Broken Bay in northern Sydney when it became distinct from the Archdiocese of Sydney in 1986.

Early life

Patrick Laurence Murphy was born to Catherine Imelda (née Deloughery) and Timothy Francis Murphy on 28 October 1920 in the Sydney suburb of Eastwood, and attended the Convent Primary school in Eastwood before completing his secondary education at Christian Brother's College, Strathfield.

Priesthood

After completing his secondary education, Patrick Murphy joined the Seminary of Saint Columba in the Blue Mountains suburb of Springwood before transferring to the Seminary of Saint Patrick in the Sydney suburb of Manly. He was ordained as a priest of the Archdiocese of Sydney by the then-Archbishop of Sydney Norman Gilroy on 22 July 1944 at the age of twenty-three.

Episcopate

Father Murphy was chosen on 20 December 1976 to be an Auxiliary Bishop of the Archdiocese of Sydney, and subsequently received his episcopal orders on 22 January 1977 by James Cardinal Freeman, at the time Archbishop of Sydney. He served in this position until on 14 April 1986 he was announced as the first bishop of the to-be-established Diocese of Broken Bay and his enthronement as such on 28 May of the same year.

Retirement and death

Under the mandatory retirement of bishops at the age of seventy-five, Bishop Murphy retired on 9 July 1996. He died on Laetare Sunday, 18 March 2007 at the age of 86.

References 

1920 births
2007 deaths
Roman Catholic bishops of Broken Bay
20th-century Roman Catholic bishops in Australia